is a Japanese multinational electronics and electrical equipment company headquartered in Nagoya, Japan. Its products include printers, multifunction printers, desktop computers, consumer and industrial sewing machines, large machine tools, label printers, typewriters, fax machines, and other computer-related electronics. Brother distributes its products both under its own name and under OEM agreements with other companies.

History 
Brother's history began in 1908 when it was originally called Yasui Sewing Machine Co in Nagoya, Japan. In 1955, Brother International Corporation (US) was established as their first overseas sales affiliate. In 1958 a European regional sales company was established in Dublin. The corporate name was changed to Brother Industries, Ltd. in 1962. Brother entered the printer market during its long association with Centronics.

In 1968 the company moved its UK headquarters to Audenshaw, Manchester, after acquiring the Jones Sewing Machine Company, a long-established British sewing machine maker.

In March 2005, "Brother Communication Space" (now the Brother Museum), a corporate museum that also serves as a public relations facility, opened in Nagoya.

In December 2011, Brother diversified its offerings by acquiring Nefsis, an innovator in web-based remote collaboration and conferencing software.

In November 2012, Brother announced that it had built the last UK-made typewriter at its north Wales factory. It had made 5.9 million typewriters in its Wrexham factory since it opened in 1985. Brother donated the last machine to London's Science Museum.

As of 31 March 2020, Brother's annual sales revenue had reached 637,259 million yen (US$6,044,666,710 at October 2020 exchange rates).

Sewing and embroidery machines 
In 2010, the sewing divisions of Brother Industries around Europe were consolidated into one larger company called "Brother Sewing Machines Europe GmbH". With a turnover in excess of €80 million,  it is the 4th largest company under the Brother Industries Ltd umbrella of organisations.

Brother Industries manufactures mechanical sewing machines in Zhuhai, China and computerised sewing & embroidery machines in Taiwan. A new sewing machine factory was opened in 2012 in Đồng Nai Province, Vietnam, which is the largest single brand sewing machine factory in the world.

In September 2012, Brother Industries manufactured their 50 millionth home sewing machine.

In May 2017, Brother Industries manufactured their 60 millionth home sewing machine.

As for Industrial sewing machines, Brother introduced S-7300A “NEXIO” is the world's first lockstitch sewing machine which adopts the Electronic Feed. NEXIO are world's first IoT applicable industrial sewing machines . The visualization by connecting sewing machine and computer technology enables the customer to analyze, manage processes and speed up productivity improvement and maintenance work.

History 
In 1908, Kanekichi Yasui established Yasui Sewing and Co. that provided repair services and parts for sewing machines. Meanwhile, Masayoshi Yasui inherited his company and renamed it to Yasui Brothers' Sewing Machine Co.

In 1928, the company's first product was a chain stitch sewing machine capable of producing straw hats. The machine was popular for its durability compared to German machines at the time.

They introduced and began mass production of home sewing machines in 1932, when Jitsuichi Yasui, Masayoshi's younger brother and co-founder of their company, succeeded in developing shuttle hooks.

In 1934, they were renamed Nippon Sewing Machine Manufacturing Co. which they subsequently manufacture industrial sewing machines in 1936.

Their 200 HA-1 domestic straight stitching sewing machines were exported to Shanghai, being requested by the Japanese government.

In 1979, they introduced and manufactured their first computerized sewing machine called ZZ3-B820 "Opus 8".

They started making commercial/multi needle sewing machines in 2003 with the introduction of the PR-600. 2010 marked their introduction of a PC design and editing software on their sewing/embroidery machines (Innov-is I) called PE-Design.

In 2013, they introduce a home cutting machine named the CM550DX.

For the Japanese market, Brother introduced a sewing and embroidery combination machine called Parie in 2017.

On August 7, 2018, Brother officially revealed their new 2019 sewing machine product lineup at their Back To Business Dealer Conference held annually in Orlando, Florida to commemorate Brother's 100th anniversary since its inception in 1908. The newest top-of-the-line Brother Sewing/Embroidery/Quilting machine is the Luminaire Innov-ìs XP-1. It features StitchVision technology, which uses light projections to virtually preview a stitch accurately and precisely, as well as a 10.6" by 16" maximum embroidery area.

Other products 

Brother diversified into manufacturing printers, label printers, MFCs, garment printers, Music sequencer, manufacturing/machine tools, and Joysound karaokes in the 1960s.

Advertising and sponsorship 
Brother sponsored Manchester City Football Club from 1987 until 1999, which is one of the longest unbroken sponsorship deals of any English football club.

Brother launched their first integrated, pan European advertising campaign in Autumn 2010 for their A3 printer range. Titled ‘141%’, referring to the ratio between paper sizes A3 and A4.

See also

 List of sewing machine brands

References

External links 

 Brother Region and Product Category selector
 Brother Support & Downloads
  — Wiki collection of bibliographic works on Brother Industries.
  — Wiki collection of bibliographic works on Brother Installation Procedure.

Electronics companies of Japan
Manufacturing companies based in Nagoya
Computer printer companies
Sewing machine brands
Wearable computers
Multinational companies headquartered in Japan
Electronics companies established in 1908
Manufacturing companies established in 1908
Japanese companies established in 1908
Companies listed on the Tokyo Stock Exchange
Japanese brands